Sars is an urban locality (an urban-type settlement) in Oktyabrsky District of Perm Krai, Russia. Population:

Geography 
Located in the upper reaches of the Sars River (Kama basin), 7 km from the Chad railway station on the Kazan-Yekaterinburg line.

The villages of Malyi Sars, Bolshoi Sars and the village of Russkii Sars are also nearby.

There are several caves and springs in the vicinity of Sars.

History 
The village of Sars was founded in 1859. The status of the township since 1939.

References

Urban-type settlements in Perm Krai